Albert Willem Snouck Hurgronje (30 May 1903 – 28 June 1967) was a Dutch footballer. He competed in the men's tournament at the 1924 Summer Olympics.

Hurgronje made six appearances for the Netherlands, in which he managed to score one goal. At club level, he played for HVV in The Hague, where he made 224 total appearances and seven goals.

References

External links

1903 births
1967 deaths
Dutch footballers
Netherlands international footballers
Olympic footballers of the Netherlands
Footballers at the 1924 Summer Olympics
Sportspeople from East Java
People from Bondowoso Regency
Association football forwards